The 2022 Missouri State Senate election took place on November 8, 2022, as part of the biennial 2022 United States elections. Half of the Senate's thirty-four seats in the Missouri Senate were up for election every two years, with each Senator serving four-year terms.

Predictions

Results summary

Statewide

Close races
Districts where the margin of victory was under 10%:
District 24, 8.569%

References

See also 

Missouri Senate
Missouri Senate elections
2022 Missouri elections